Marie-Thérèse Vauzou (August 10, 1825 –  November 3, 1907) was a French Catholic nun who is known as having been the Mistress of Novices and later Mother Superior at the Sisters of Charity of Nevers, during the time that Bernadette Soubirous was alive.

Biography
She was born in Collonges-la-Rouge, France; her father was a notary.

She rose through the ranks of the Saint Gildard Convent and in 1861 became Mistress of Novices. A few years later, Marie-Bernard "Bernadette" Soubirous began to visit stating she was interested in becoming a postulant, a process she started in 1865. In 1858, Soubirous had become famous within the Catholic religion after having claimed she had visions of seeing the Immaculate Conception.

While Sister Vauzou supported Soubirous joining the convent and later admitted a certain fondness and acceptance of Soubirous's "charisma and beauty", Vauzou never fully believed her claims of visions and treated her poorly. She disagreed with the decision of Canonization for Soubirous after she died in 1879 at the age of 35.

Vauzou became Mother Superior and she was forced to testify in front of religious officials about Soubirous in 1899. She told them that she knew Sister Bernadette better than most, having spent much time with her during her early years at the convent, and described her as vain and simple. She asked religious officials to wait until she was dead to begin the process of sainthood. Little is known about her final years, but it is known Vauzou struggled internally with her feelings about Bernadette and went to visit a monk at the Fontfroide Abbey, who helped her regain spiritual peace following Bernadette's death.

When Vauzou died in 1907, investigations began in 1909 and Bernadette was officially canonized in 1933.

Sister Vauzou is buried on the grounds of the motherhouse in Nevers.

Portrayal in media
Sister Vauzou was portrayed by English actress Gladys Cooper in the 1943 film  The Song of Bernadette, which was based on Franz Werfel's 1941 novel of the same name. Cooper was nominated for the Academy Award for Best Supporting Actress for her performance.

In the 1946 Broadway play of the same name, Sister Vauzou was portrayed by actress Jean Mann.

References 

1825 births
1907 deaths
20th-century French nuns
Sisters of Charity of Nevers
19th-century French nuns